The Death of Economics  is a book written by Paul Ormerod. According to the author the title does not imply that the study of economies is not of great importance but rather it argues that conventional economics offers a misleading view of how the world operates and needs to be replaced.

Overview
The book is split into two parts. The first part contains Ormerod's assessment of the present state of economics; the second part represents a series of suggestions as to how economics can be developed, particularly in relation to unemployment.

Three properties are identified as essential to any model seeking to explain unemployment. First the model should be capable of settling into long periods of regular fluctuations; second, such fluctuations should be sensitive to the initial values of the system; thirdly, following a major shock, there should be no tendency to settle back to the regular behaviour previously seen.

Originally published for the United Kingdom in 1994, Death of Economics has been translated into more than 10 languages.

References

External links
 Revisiting The Death of Economics, Ormerod reviewed his book in 2001
 Author's book homepage, with sample chapters

1994 non-fiction books
Books about philosophy of economics
Faber and Faber books